Blanca Álvarez González (8 September 1957 in Cartavio – 14 February 2021 in Oviedo) was a Spanish journalist, writer, and poet. Her work included poetry, novels, and essays, as well as children's and youth literature.

Awards 

 International Poetry Prize, Cálamo Awards.
 White Ravens 2001 for "Milú, un perro en desgracia" (Milú, a dog in disgrace).
 2002, XIII Ala Delta Prize for "Caracoles, pendientes y mariposas" (Snails, earrings and butterflies)
 2004, National Libraries of Venezuela chooses his book "El puente de los cerezos" as the best book published in Spanish.
 2004, Critics' Prize of Asturias.
 2005, Destino Infantil Apel-les Mestres Award 2005.
 2007, Finalist in the Lazarillo Prize with "El maleficio de la espina", Destino Publishing House.
 2007, "Palabras de pan" is chosen by the National Libraries of Venezuela, once again, as the best title published in Spanish.
 2012, Anaya Prize for Children's Literature, for his children's novel "Aún te quedan ratones por cazar"

References

1957 births
2021 deaths
Spanish poets